P&O is a British shipping and logistics company. It may also refer to:

Shipping 

 P&O (company) (in full, The Peninsular and Oriental Steam Navigation Company), a former British shipping and logistics company
 P&O Cruises, a British cruise line that was originally part of P&O, now owned by Carnival Corporation & plc
 P&O Cruises Australia, an Australian cruise line that was originally part of P&O, now owned by Carnival Corporation & plc
 P&O Ferries, a ferry line that was originally part of P&O, now owned by DP World
 P&O Irish Sea, a former company, now merged into P&O Ferries
 P&O Portsmouth, a former company, now merged into P&O Ferries
 P&O Stena Line, a former company, now merged into P&O Ferries
 P&O Nedlloyd, a former shipping company that was also originally part of P&O

Shipping related 

 P&O Bank, a bank that the P&O Company founded in 1920 and sold in 1927.

Other 

 Pickling (metal) and oiling raw steel.
 Phosphate conversion coating and oiling aluminium, zinc, cadmium, silver, or tin.